MySensors is a free and open source DIY (do-it yourself) software framework for wireless IoT (Internet of Things) devices allowing devices to communicate using radio transmitters. The library was originally developed for the Arduino platform.

The MySensors devices create a virtual radio network of nodes that automatically forms a self healing mesh like structure. Each node can relay messages for other nodes to cover greater distances using simple short range transceivers. Each node can have several sensors or actuators attached and can interact with other nodes in the network.

The radio network can consist of up to 254 nodes where one node can act as a gateway to the internet or a home automation controller. The controller adds functionality to the radio network such as id assignment and time awareness.

Supported hardware platforms 

The framework can natively be run on the following platforms and micro controllers. 
 Linux / Raspberry Pi
 ATMega 328P
 ESP8266
 ESP32  
 ARM Cortex M0 (mainly Atmel SAMD core as used in Arduino Zero)

Communication options 

MySensors supports wireless communication using the following transceivers:
 NRF24L01
 RFM69
 RFM95 (LoRa)
 WiFi (ESP8266 & ESP32)
Wired communication over:
 MQTT 
 Serial USB 
 RS485

Security 

The wireless communication can be signed using truncated HMAC-SHA256 either through hardware with Atmel ATSHA204A or compatible software emulation and optionally encrypted. The implementation is timing neutral with whitened random numbers, attack detection-and-lockout and protects against timing attacks, replay attacks and man in the middle attacks.

Over the air firmware updates 

The firmware of a MySensor node can be updated over the air using a few different bootloader options:
 In place overwriting of flash memory using MySensorsBootloaderRF24. 
 Using external flash with the DualOptiBoot.
 For ESP8266 nodes using  the built in OTA feature.

See also 
 Arduino
 ESP8266

References

External links 
 Official Website
 OpenHardware.io
 
 Russian Community MySensors

Microcontroller software
Home automation
Internet of things
Open hardware electronic devices
Open hardware and software organizations and companies